ICSR or I.C.S.R. may refer to:

 Individual Case Safety Report, in pharmacovigilance
 International Conference on Social Robotics
 International Conference on Software Reuse
 International Centre for the Study of Radicalisation and Political Violence, based in the Department of War Studies at King's College London